Paiwan may refer to:
the Paiwan people
the Paiwan language